The American Arbitration Association (AAA) is a not-for-profit organization focused in the field of alternative dispute resolution, providing services to individuals and organizations who wish to resolve conflicts out of court, and one of several arbitration organizations that administers arbitration proceedings. The AAA also administers mediation and other forms of alternative dispute resolution. It is headquartered in New York City, with regional offices in Atlanta, Boston, Charlotte, Chicago, Dallas, Denver, Detroit, East Providence, Rhode Island, Fresno, Houston, Los Angeles, Miami, Minneapolis, New York City, Philadelphia, Phoenix, San Antonio, San Diego, San Francisco, Seattle, Somerset, New Jersey and Washington, DC.

The AAA also administers International Centre for Dispute Resolution (ICDR), established in 1996 and oversees international arbitration proceedings initiated under AAA rules.  ICDR currently has offices in New York City, Mexico City, Singapore, and Bahrain.

History 
The AAA was founded in 1926 by the merger of the Arbitration Society of America and the Arbitration Foundation to provide dispute resolution and avoid civil court proceedings.

Many contracts include an arbitration clause naming the AAA as the organization that will administer arbitration between the parties. The AAA does not itself arbitrate disputes, but provides administrative support to arbitrations before a single arbitrator or a panel of three arbitrators. Under its rules, the AAA may appoint an arbitrator in some circumstances, for example, where the parties cannot agree on an arbitrator or a party fails to exercise its right to appoint an arbitrator.

In July 2009, the AAA stopped accepting consumer debt collection cases, after the National Arbitration Forum was forced to do so after questions arose about the fairness of its process.

In April 2013, the New York State Department of Financial Services hired the AAA to host mediation sessions between insurance companies and Hurricane Sandy victims.

See also
 Arbitration in the United States
 Federal Mediation and Conciliation Service
 International arbitration
 London Court of International Arbitration
 International Chamber of Commerce
 National Academy of Arbitrators

References

External links
American Arbitration Association
 International Centre for Dispute Resolution
Mediation.org
Guide to the American Arbitration Association. Voluntary Labor Arbitration Tribunal case files, 1955-1960. #5119. Kheel Center for Labor-Management Documentation and Archives, Cornell University Library.

Arbitration organizations
Trade associations based in the United States
1926 establishments in New York (state)